Unholy is a concept in religion.

Unholy may also refer to:

Film
 The Unholy (1988 film), a 1988 horror film
 Unholy (2007 film), a 2007 film
  The Unholy (2021 film), a 2021 horror film

Music
 Unholy (band), a Finnish doom metal group
 Unholy (Brainstorm album)
 Unholy (Martin Grech album), 2005
 "Unholy" (Kiss song), 1992
 "Unholy" (Sam Smith and Kim Petras song), 2022
 Unholy Records, a record label

See also
 Unholy Alliance (disambiguation)
 Unholy Trinity (disambiguation)